Dhoop ( Sunshine) is a 2003 Indian war drama film directed by  Ashwini Chaudhary, based on Battle of Tiger Hill. Actress Gul Panag made her Bollywood debut with this film.
The film stars Om Puri and Revathi and is loosely based on Captain Anuj Nayyar, MVC and his family.

Plot
The movie is based on the events surrounding the death of Honorable Capt Anuj Nayyar, MVC of 17 Jat Regiment of the Indian Army, who was martyred in operations against Pakistani Army soldiers, in the southwest sector of Tiger Hill on 5 July 1999 as part of the Kargil conflict.
The story of the Kapoor family in the film depicts the real events that happened in the lives of the Nayyar family.

Capt Rohit Kapoor (Sanjay Suri) is a young officer in the 17 Jat Regiment of the Indian Army.
His father Prof Suresh Kumar Kapoor (Om Puri), is a professor of economics in the Delhi School of Economics. His mother Sarita Kapoor (Revathi), is a librarian at the Delhi University Central Library. He is engaged to be married to Pihu Verma (Gul Panag).

The story-line of the movie takes place between 1999–2002, beginning with the death of Captain Kapoor while successfully defeating insurgents to capture Pt 4875 on the western side of Tiger Hill, Kargil.

The news is a huge shock to his family and the first half of the film portrays their attempts to cope with their grief. They receive messages of condolence from various high government officials as they attempt to come to terms with their loss.

As compensation for the loss of their son, the government allots them a franchise for running a petrol pump. Mrs Savita Kapoor is aghast at such an offer, and the family is not  inclined to avail of this compensation. However, after a visit from Major Kaul, Capt Kapoor's immediate senior in the Regiment, Prof. Kapoor and Pihu feel it might be a worthy site to commemorate the memory of Rohit and decide to take up the offer. Savita gets convinced by her husband Prof. Kapoor.

However, as they attempt to make this dream a reality, they encounter massive corruption and red tape at various levels of Indian bureaucracy. They are threatened and humiliated by various government officials and hooligans. However, the family perseveres in the face of immense odds and continues to struggle. The latter half of the film narrates the story of their mission.

Cast
Om Puri as Prof Suresh Kumar Kapoor, Rohit's father
Revathi as Savita Kapoor, Rohit's mother
Sanjay Suri as Captain Rohit Kapoor
Gul Panag as Peehu Verma, fiancée of Rohit
Yashpal Sharma as Inspector Ram Singh Mallik 
Virendra Saxena as Viru Bhai
Murli Sharma as Col.Rathore
Ganesh Yadav as Murli Pandey
Gopi Desai as Rukma
Gautam Saugat as Balbir
Ashutosh Jha as Raman
Niharika as Nishi
Ehsaan Khan as Akhil Verma, Peehu's father
Paritosh Sand as Major Kaul
Rohitash Gaud as L/Nk Nihar Singh
Preeti Dayal as Naina Verma, Peehu's mother
Neeraj Sood as Dobriyal, clerk
Prasad Pandit as Mr Ghosh
Rajesh Mishra as Pandu
Jogi as Kalia, Jr Engineer
Shirish Handa as Manav
Kuldeep Sharma as Manav's father
Raj Kanojia as Auto driver
Shagun Luthra as News reporter
Sam Bharoucha as OSD
Shakti Singh as Sameer Taman
Richa Nayyar as Sharbati

Reception
The film was not successful at box office. However, it got critical acclaim.

Inspiration
The film is an account of the inspiring struggle of Prof Nayyar and his family against entrenched systemic corruption. His dream was finally realized with the setting up of the petrol pump named 'Kargil Heights', in the Vasundhara Enclave area of New Delhi

Prof Nayyar's struggles continued for several years, and the film serves to highlight the appalling treatment meted out to the families of courageous Indian soldiers who gave their lives in protecting the nation.

Music

Awards and nominations

Zee Cine Awards 2003

Nominated
Best Actress in a Supporting Role - Revathi
Best Story - Kumud Chaudhary

Screen Weekly Awards 2004

Nominated
Best Dialogue - Kumud Chaudhary, Sanjay Chauhan
Best Story - Kumud Chaudhary
Best Supporting Actress - Revathi

References

External links
 

2003 films
2000s Hindi-language films
Kargil War
Indian films based on actual events
Indian biographical films
Films about corruption in India
Films scored by Lalit Sen
Indian Army in films
Cultural depictions of prime ministers of India